{{safesubst:#invoke:RfD||2=Tourism in Capri|month = March
|day =  7
|year = 2023
|time = 10:20
|timestamp = 20230307102044

|content=

You may wish to visit one of the articles listed below instead:

}}